Huang Wenyong (25 July 1952 – 20 April 2013) was a Malaysia-born Singaporean actor and former teacher of Chinese descent. Local media and colleagues referred to him as "Ah Ge" (senior actor) due to his status.  Huang died at the Singapore General Hospital at around 5 pm (GMT+8) on 20 April 2013, at the age of 60 due to lymphoma.

Early life and career
Huang was a teacher in Kuala Lumpur before leaving for Singapore. Huang moved to Singapore in the 1970s, with only fifty dollars in hand. He joined the Singapore Broadcasting Corporation in 1981. He is perhaps best known for his appearances in The Awakening, in which he played love interest to Xiang Yun's character, and The Seletar Robbery in 1982. Huang is also known for starring alongside Chew Chor Meng in the long-running popular series Don't Worry, Be Happy (1996–2002) and its spin-off Lobang King as the stingy uncle Leon Ong Kim Lye to Chew's character Ah Bee. Huang was nominated for and named one of the Top 10 Most Popular Male Artistes every single year in the annual Star Awards since its introduction in 1994, until his death in 2013. In total, Huang starred in more than a hundred Chinese-language television programmes. In addition to acting, Huang sang pieces for a few television sitcoms and also released two albums. He was an ambassador for anti-ageing product company Zell-V.
He was an actor for MediaCorp from the late 1970s until his death. Appearing in more than 100 television programmes, he was among the first few batches of locally trained actors to enter the local entertainment industry was and considered to be one of the "pioneers in local Chinese drama".

Personal life
Huang gained Singapore citizenship in October 2008 after residing in the country for 27 years. Huang was married with two children: a son and a daughter. He was a "lifelong devotee" of Buddhism.

Health
There was public concern after Huang appeared visibly haggard during MediaCorp Channel 8's 30th Drama Anniversary Show. He clarified that he had been suffering from stomach flu, said to have been contracted in September 2012. During which, he was estimated to have lost 6–7 kilograms in weight. Huang would also experience intervals of severe fever. In November 2012, Huang was diagnosed with lymphoma and had to go for chemotherapy. His condition was not disclosed to the general public until his death, because Huang "wanted to go through this by himself".

Death
Huang died at the Singapore General Hospital at around 5 p.m. (GMT+8) on 20 April 2013, aged 60. The cause of his death was lymphoma. Huang was previously subject to a death hoax earlier in the month, which claimed that he had been diagnosed with terminal cancer. Huang is survived by his wife and two children. His medical condition had been kept under the wraps; only very few knew what actually ailed him. Huang's death sparked an "outpouring of grief" from both colleagues and fans alike. Thirty seconds of silence were observed and a special tribute segment aired before the start of the Star Awards ceremony held the evening after his death.

Funeral
His funeral wake was held a day after his death on 21 April 2013 at the Teochew Funeral Parlour, lasting for five days. Xiang Yun and Chen Shucheng delivered eulogies, as did a few others. Funeral attendees were measured by the hundreds. To allow their staff to attend the procession, Channel 8 temporarily postponed or rescheduled their production activities. He was cremated at the Bright Hill Crematorium and Columbarium in Sin Ming.

Legacy
In recognition of his contributions to the television industry in Singapore, Huang was posthumously awarded the "Honorary TV Award" on 28 April 2013, at the Star Awards 2013. To commemorate his death, a television special titled Remembering Huang Wenyong was aired on 29 April 2013, and reruns of his television appearances were available on television and online platforms.

In October 2014, the Madame Tussauds Singapore museum unveiled a wax figure of Huang.

Filmography

Television

Films

Variety Shows

Accolades

Notes

References

1952 births
2013 deaths
Deaths from cancer in Singapore
Deaths from lymphoma
Singaporean Buddhists
Singaporean people of Teochew descent
Malaysian emigrants to Singapore
People from Kuala Lumpur
Singaporean male television actors
Singaporean male film actors
Singaporean television personalities
20th-century Singaporean male actors
21st-century Singaporean male actors